The Family Health Care Decisions Act is a statute adopted in New York state in 2010 that had been pending before the legislature since 1994.  The statute was approved by the New York State Senate in July, 2009. The legislation was introduced by state senator Thomas Duane of Manhattan. It was signed into law by Gov. David Paterson on March 16, 2010. 

The law adds new Articles 29-CC and 29-CCC to the Public Health Law and amends other existing sections of the laws of the State. It allows the relatives of incapacitated patients to make medical decisions for their family members in the absence of a living will or health care proxy.  Currently, all other states except for Missouri permit such surrogacy.  Advocates have called the bill the "most important piece of medical legislation since lawmakers legalized health care proxies in 1990."

Purposes and scope

Before this law went into effect, the only legal rights that a husband or wife had in New York regarding a spouse who cannot make medical decisions is to choose whether he or she should be resuscitated after a cardiac arrest.  The goal of this FHCDA is to guarantee that family members have increased control over their relatives' health.  

Among the safeguard provided in the bill are rules that require the capacity of the patient must be assessed and reassessed by two physicians, that spouses rely upon the stated wishes of the incapacitated patient and that life-sustaining care be curtailed only when a patient is either terminally ill, won't regain consciousness, or has an irreversible medical condition that will result in great suffering.

Controversy
Two features of the legislation proved controversial prior to enactment.  One allowed domestic partners to act as surrogates, a provision that was opposed by those concerned that it would buttress the claims of those who favored gay marriage.  This concern became a moot point after New York recognized same-sex marriage.  Another was the absence of any provision guaranteeing that the welfare of fetuses will be considered when making surrogacy decisions for incapacitated pregnant women.

Dr. Jacob Appel, a backer of the legislation, argued that it "would give New Yorkers a right that many believe they already possess." Supporters of the law include the Healthcare Association of New York State and Compassion & Choices.

In 2007 the bill was revised to require health care providers who disagree with a surrogate choice for life-saving treatment nevertheless to provide it, pending either transfer to a willing health care provider or judicial review; thereafter, the Right to Life Committee endorsed and lobbied for the legislation.

References

See also
 Advance health care directive - Living Will
 Uniform Rights of the Terminally Ill Act
 Do Not Resuscitate
 Patient refusal of nutrition and hydration
 MOLST

United States state health legislation
New York (state) statutes